There are about 800 types of moths of Angola The moths (mostly nocturnal) and butterflies (mostly diurnal) together make up the taxonomic order Lepidoptera.

This is a list of moth species which have been recorded in Angola.

Anomoeotidae
Anomoeotes infuscata Talbot, 1929
Anomoeotes leucolena Holland, 1893
Anomoeotes phaeomera Hampson, 1920
Staphylinochrous albabasis Bethune-Baker, 1911
Thermochrous marginata Talbot, 1929

Arctiidae
Acantharctia nivea Aurivillius, 1900
Afrasura crenulata (Bethune-Baker, 1911)
Afrasura hieroglyphica (Bethune-Baker, 1911)
Afrasura indecisa (Walker, 1869)
Afrasura obliterata (Walker, 1864)
Afrospilarctia flavida (Bartel, 1903)
Afrospilarctia lucida (Druce, 1898)
Alpenus investigatorum (Karsch, 1898)
Alpenus maculosa (Stoll, 1781)
Alpenus nigropunctata (Bethune-Baker, 1908)
Amata alicia (Butler, 1876)
Amata pembertoni Rothschild, 1910
Amata tripunctata (Bethune-Baker, 1911)
Amerila brunnea (Hampson, 1901)
Amerila bubo (Walker, 1855)
Amerila luteibarba (Hampson, 1901)
Amerila niveivitrea (Bartel, 1903)
Amerila rufifemur (Walker, 1855)
Amerila vitrea Plötz, 1880
Amsacta aureolimbata Rothschild, 1910
Anaphosia parallela Bethune-Baker, 1911
Anapisa histrio (Kiriakoff, 1953)
Argina astrea (Drury, 1773)
Asura pectinella Strand, 1922
Balacra batesi Druce, 1910
Balacra caeruleifascia Walker, 1856
Balacra compsa (Jordan, 1904)
Balacra daphaena (Hampson, 1898)
Balacra flavimacula Walker, 1856
Balacra nigripennis (Aurivillius, 1904)
Balacra pulchra Aurivillius, 1892
Balacra rubricincta Holland, 1893
Binna penicillata Walker, 1865
Ceryx flava Bethune-Baker, 1911
Creatonotos leucanioides Holland, 1893
Dionychoscelis venata Aurivillius, 1922
Dubatolovia neurophaea (Hampson, 1911)
Eilema minutissima Bethune-Baker, 1911
Eilema triplaiola (Bethune-Baker, 1911)
Estigmene flaviceps Hampson, 1907
Estigmene internigralis Hampson, 1905
Estigmene neuriastis Hampson, 1907
Estigmene tenuistrigata (Hampson, 1900)
Estigmene trivitta (Walker, 1855)
Euchromia lethe (Fabricius, 1775)
Eyralpenus diplosticta (Hampson, 1900)
Eyralpenus inconspicua (Rothschild, 1910)
Eyralpenus metaxantha (Hampson, 1920)
Eyralpenus scioana (Oberthür, 1880)
Galtara nepheloptera (Hampson, 1910)
Ischnarctia brunnescens Bartel, 1903
Ischnarctia oberthueri (Rothschild, 1910)
Meganaclia perpusilla (Walker, 1856)
Metarctia diversa Bethune-Baker, 1911
Metarctia flavicincta Aurivillius, 1900
Metarctia flavivena Hampson, 1901
Metarctia heinrichi Kiriakoff, 1961
Metarctia inconspicua Holland, 1892
Metarctia jordani Kiriakoff, 1957
Metarctia lateritia Herrich-Schäffer, 1855
Metarctia pallens Bethune-Baker, 1911
Metarctia paremphares Holland, 1893
Metarctia rubribasa Bethune-Baker, 1911
Metarctia salmonea Kiriakoff, 1957
Metarctia unicolor (Oberthür, 1880)
Metarctia uniformis Bethune-Baker, 1911
Micralarctia punctulatum (Wallengren, 1860)
Nacliodes microsippia Strand, 1912
Nanna diplisticta (Bethune-Baker, 1911)
Nanna melanosticta (Bethune-Baker, 1911)
Nyctemera apicalis (Walker, 1854)
Nyctemera itokina (Aurivillius, 1904)
Nyctemera rattrayi (Swinhoe, 1904)
Onychipodia flavithorax Rothschild, 1912
Ovenna simulans (Mabille, 1878)
Ovenna vicaria (Walker, 1854)
Paralacydes arborifera (Butler, 1875)
Paramaenas nephelistis (Hampson, 1907)
Paramelisa lophuroides Oberthür, 1911
Popoudina griseipennis (Bartel, 1903)
Pseudlepista holoxantha Hampson, 1918
Pseudothyretes carnea (Hampson, 1898)
Pseudothyretes perpusilla (Walker, 1856)
Pseudothyretes rubicundula (Strand, 1912)
Pusiola celida (Bethune-Baker, 1911)
Pusiola curta (Rothschild, 1912)
Rhabdomarctia rubrilineata (Bethune-Baker, 1911)
Rhipidarctia invaria (Walker, 1856)
Rhipidarctia pareclecta (Holland, 1893)
Rhipidarctia rubrovitta (Aurivillius, 1904)
Saenura flava Wallengren, 1860
Secusio ansorgei Rothschild, 1933
Secusio deilemera Talbot, 1929
Secusio discoidalis Talbot, 1929
Secusio drucei Rothschild, 1933
Secusio monteironis Rothschild, 1933
Siccia atriguttata Hampson, 1909
Spilosoma angolensis Bartel, 1903
Spilosoma bipartita Rothschild, 1933
Spilosoma chionea (Hampson, 1900)
Spilosoma heterogenea Bartel, 1903
Spilosoma lineata Walker, 1855
Spilosoma semihyalina Bartel, 1903
Spilosoma unipuncta (Hampson, 1905)
Stenarctia abdominalis Rothschild, 1910
Stenarctia quadripunctata Aurivillius, 1900
Teracotona euprepia Hampson, 1900
Teracotona euprepioides Wichgraf, 1921
Teracotona homeyeri Rothschild, 1910
Teracotona immaculata (Wichgraf, 1921)
Teracotona pardalina Bartel, 1903
Teracotona trifasciata Bartel, 1903
Thyretes monteiroi Butler, 1876
Utetheisa pulchella (Linnaeus, 1758)

Autostichidae
Pachnistis morologa Meyrick, 1923

Bombycidae
Racinoa obliquisigna (Hampson, 1910)

Cossidae
Aethalopteryx squameus (Distant, 1902)
Azygophleps tandoensis Bethune-Baker, 1927
Pseudurgis sceliphrota Meyrick, 1923

Crambidae
Aethaloessa floridalis (Zeller, 1852)
Euclasta varii Popescu-Gorj & Constantinescu, 1973
Nomophila noctuella ([Denis & Schiffermüller], 1775)

Drepanidae
Epicampoptera tamsi Watson, 1965
Gonoreta subtilis (Bryk, 1913)
Spidia fenestrata Butler, 1878

Eupterotidae
Catajana bimaculata (Dewitz, 1879)
Hemijana subrosea (Aurivillius, 1893)
Jana variegata Rothschild, 1917
Phiala costipuncta (Herrich-Schäffer, 1855)
Stenoglene gemmatus Wichgraf, 1921

Gelechiidae
Pectinophora gossypiella (Saunders, 1844)

Geometridae
Acollesis umbrata Warren, 1899
Afrophyla vethi (Snellen, 1886)
Antharmostes alcaea Prout, 1930
Aphilopota interpellans (Butler, 1875)
Aphilopota melanostigma (Warren, 1904)
Aphilopota strigosissima (Bastelberger, 1909)
Asthenotricha straba Prout, 1921
Biston abruptaria (Walker, 1869)
Biston subocularia (Mabille, 1893)
Cacostegania australis Warren, 1901
Cacostegania confusa (Warren, 1901)
Cartaletis variabilis (Butler, 1878)
Chiasmia angolae (Bethune-Baker, 1913)
Chiasmia conturbata (Warren, 1898)
Chiasmia crassata (Warren, 1897)
Chiasmia grimmia (Wallengren, 1872)
Chiasmia kilimanjarensis (Holland, 1892)
Chiasmia majestica (Warren, 1901)
Chiasmia parallacta (Warren, 1897)
Chiasmia procidata (Guenée, 1858)
Chiasmia rhabdophora (Holland, 1892)
Chiasmia umbrata (Warren, 1897)
Chloroclystis insignifica Bethune-Baker, 1913
Chlorosterrha semialba (Swinhoe, 1906)
Cleora derogaria (Snellen, 1872)
Cleora rostella D. S. Fletcher, 1967
Coenina aurivena Butler, 1898
Collesis fleximargo (Warren, 1909)
Conchylia alternata (Warren, 1901)
Cyclophora landanata (Mabille, 1898)
Drepanogynis incogitata Prout, 1915
Drepanogynis rufaria (Warren, 1909)
Eois grataria (Walker, 1861)
Epigynopteryx maeviaria (Guenée, 1858)
Erastria albosignata (Walker, 1863)
Eretmopus ampla (Warren, 1904)
Eupithecia celatisigna (Warren, 1902)
Geodena inferma Swinhoe, 1904
Geodena robusta Bethune-Baker, 1911
Geolyces convexaria (Mabille, 1890)
Heterorachis prouti Bethune-Baker, 1913
Idaea circumsticta (Warren, 1904)
Idaea flamingo (Warren, 1901)
Idaea hispidata (Warren, 1904)
Idaea lilliputaria (Warren, 1902)
Idaea torrida (Warren, 1904)
Larentia attenuata (Walker, 1862)
Lophorrhachia aenospila (Bethune-Baker, 1913)
Miantochora polychroaria (Mabille, 1890)
Miantochora punctuligera (Mabille, 1879)
Miantochora venerata (Mabille, 1879)
Microloxia ruficornis Warren, 1897
Mixocera albistrigata (Pagenstecher, 1893)
Mixocera obliqua Bethune-Baker, 1913
Narthecusa tenuiorata Walker, 1862
Nothoterpna crassisquama Warren, 1909
Nothoterpna pallida (Warren, 1904)
Ochroplutodes bisecta (Warren, 1904)
Omphalucha brunnea (Warren, 1899)
Omphalucha indigna (Prout, 1915)
Omphalucha rufinubes Warren, 1905
Omphax rubriceps (Warren, 1904)
Orbamia octomaculata (Wallengren, 1872)
Orbamia subaurata (Warren, 1899)
Paragathia albimarginata Warren, 1902
Phthonandria pinguis (Warren, 1904)
Piercia ansorgei (Bethune-Baker, 1913)
Pitthea famula Drury, 1773
Pitthea subflaveola Bethune-Baker, 1911
Plateoplia acrobelia (Wallengren, 1875)
Prasinocyma pictifimbria Warren, 1904
Prasinocyma tandi Bethune-Baker, 1913
Proutiana perconspersa (Prout, 1915)
Pseudolarentia megalaria (Guenée, 1858)
Psilocerea pulverosa (Warren, 1894)
Rhodesia alboviridata (Saalmüller, 1880)
Rhodophthitus castus Warren, 1904
Rhodophthitus procellosa Warren, 1905
Rhodophthitus thapsinus Prout, 1931
Scopula crassipuncta (Warren, 1901)
Scopula fimbrilineata (Warren, 1902)
Scopula latitans Prout, 1920
Scopula lubricata (Warren, 1905)
Scopula magnidiscata (Warren, 1904)
Scopula penricei Prout, 1920
Scopula rubriceps (Warren, 1905)
Scopula sanguinisecta (Warren, 1897)
Scopula serena Prout, 1920
Scopula sincera (Warren, 1901)
Scopula sinnaria Swinhoe, 1904
Somatina virginalis Prout, 1917
Syncollesis bellista (Bethune-Baker, 1913)
Terina internata (Warren, 1909)
Terina niphanda Druce, 1887
Terina sanguinarea Bethune-Baker, 1911
Trimetopia aetheraria Guenée, 1858
Victoria perornata Warren, 1898
Xenostega tincta Warren, 1899
Zamarada acosmeta Prout, 1921
Zamarada acrochra Prout, 1928
Zamarada adumbrata D. S. Fletcher, 1974
Zamarada angustimargo Warren, 1901
Zamarada astyphela D. S. Fletcher, 1974
Zamarada bonaberiensis Strand, 1915
Zamarada denticatella Prout, 1922
Zamarada dentigera Warren, 1909
Zamarada dolorosa D. S. Fletcher, 1974
Zamarada dyscapna D. S. Fletcher, 1974
Zamarada euphrosyne Oberthür, 1912
Zamarada excavata Bethune-Baker, 1913
Zamarada fibulata D. S. Fletcher, 1974
Zamarada flavicaput Warren, 1901
Zamarada glareosa Bastelberger, 1909
Zamarada gracilata D. S. Fletcher, 1974
Zamarada hero D. S. Fletcher, 1974
Zamarada ignicosta Prout, 1912
Zamarada lepta D. S. Fletcher, 1974
Zamarada melanopyga Herbulot, 1954
Zamarada melpomene Oberthür, 1912
Zamarada metrioscaphes Prout, 1912
Zamarada ordinaria Bethune-Baker, 1913
Zamarada paxilla D. S. Fletcher, 1974
Zamarada phaeozona Hampson, 1909
Zamarada polyctemon Prout, 1932
Zamarada purimargo Prout, 1912
Zamarada reflexaria (Walker, 1863)
Zamarada seydeli D. S. Fletcher, 1974
Zamarada terpsichore Oberthür, 1912
Zamarada tortura D. S. Fletcher, 1974
Zamarada unisona D. S. Fletcher, 1974
Zamarada vigilans Prout, 1915

Glyphipterigidae
Glyphipterix leucophragma Meyrick, 1923
Glyphipterix molybdastra Meyrick, 1923

Hepialidae
Afrotheora flavimaculata Nielsen & Scoble, 1986
Afrotheora jordani (Viette, 1956)
Eudalaca hololeuca (Hampson, 1910)
Gorgopi libania (Stoll, 1781)

Himantopteridae
Doratopteryx xanthomelas Rothschild & Jordan, 1903
Semioptila ansorgei Rothschild, 1907
Semioptila fulveolans (Mabille, 1897)
Semioptila lydia Weymer, 1908

Lacturidae
Gymnogramma plagiula Meyrick, 1923

Lasiocampidae
Braura truncatum (Walker, 1855)
Catalebeda elegans Aurivillius, 1925
Catalebeda producta (Walker, 1855)
Cheligium lineatum (Aurivillius, 1893)
Chrysopsyche mirifica (Butler, 1878)
Eucraera aphrasta Tams, 1936
Eucraera gemmata (Distant, 1897)
Eucraera koellikerii (Dewitz, 1881)
Euwallengrenia reducta (Walker, 1855)
Filiola lanceolata (Hering, 1932)
Gelo jordani (Tams, 1936)
Gonometa bicolor Dewitz, 1881
Grellada imitans (Aurivillius, 1893)
Laeliopsis gemmatus (Wichgraf, 1921)
Lechriolepis dewitzi Aurivillius, 1927
Lechriolepis flaveola (Bethune-Baker, 1911)
Lechriolepis rotunda Strand, 1912
Leipoxais fuscofasciata Aurivillius, 1908
Leipoxais peraffinis Holland, 1893
Leipoxais proboscidea (Guérin-Méneville, 1832)
Mallocampa zopheropa (Bethune-Baker, 1911)
Metajana chanleri Holland, 1896
Mimopacha gerstaeckerii (Dewitz, 1881)
Mimopacha jordani Tams, 1936
Mimopacha knoblauchii (Dewitz, 1881)
Odontocheilopteryx cuanza Gurkovich & Zolotuhin, 2009
Odontocheilopteryx phoneus Hering, 1928
Odontopacha spissa Tams, 1929
Pachyna subfascia (Walker, 1855)
Pachytrina honrathii (Dewitz, 1881)
Pachytrina papyroides (Tams, 1936)
Pachytrina wenigina Zolotuhin & Gurkovich, 2009
Pallastica pyrsocoma (Tams, 1936)
Pallastica pyrsocorsa (Tams, 1936)
Philotherma melambela Tams, 1936
Philotherma spargata (Holland, 1893)
Philotherma tandoensis Bethune-Baker, 1927
Pseudolyra bubalitica Tams, 1929
Pseudolyra caiala (Tams, 1936)
Pseudolyra lineadentata (Bethune-Baker, 1911)
Pseudolyra miona (Tams, 1936)
Pseudometa jordani Tams, 1936
Pseudometa plinthochroa Tams, 1936
Sena quirimbo (Tams, 1936)
Stenophatna rothschildi (Tams, 1936)
Stoermeriana amphilecta (Tams, 1936)
Stoermeriana coilotoma (Bethune-Baker, 1911)
Stoermeriana pamphenges (Tams, 1936)
Stoermeriana sminthocara (Tams, 1936)
Streblote jordani (Tams, 1936)
Trabala burchardi (Dewitz, 1881)
Trichopisthia igneotincta (Aurivillius, 1909)

Lecithoceridae
Odites citromela Meyrick, 1923

Limacodidae
Altha ansorgei Bethune-Baker, 1911
Brachia argentolineata Wichgraf, 1922
Chrysectropa roseofasciata (Aurivillius, 1900)
Chrysopoloma ansorgei Bethune-Baker, 1911
Delorhachis chlorodaedala Tams, 1928
Macroplectra hieraglyphica Bethune-Baker, 1911
Macroplectra rosea Bethune-Baker, 1911
Narosa barnsi Tams, 1929
Paragetor concolor Bethune-Baker, 1911
Paraplectra modesta Bethune-Baker, 1911
Parasa cor West, 1940
Parasa marginata West, 1940
Parasa tripartita Bethune-Baker, 1911
Phorma pepon Karsch, 1896
Pseudomantria flava Bethune-Baker, 1911
Taeda punctistriga Weymer, 1908
Thoseidea lineapunctata (Bethune-Baker, 1911)
Vipsania unicolora (Bethune-Baker, 1911)

Lymantriidae
Aclonophlebia atectonipha Collenette, 1936
Aclonophlebia xuthomene Collenette, 1936
Aroa leonensis Hampson, 1910
Aroa melanoleuca Hampson, 1905
Barlowia nephodes Collenette, 1932
Cadurca moco Collenette, 1936
Cadurca venata (Swinhoe, 1906)
Cropera celaenogyia Collenette, 1936
Cropera sericoptera Collenette, 1932
Cropera seydeli (Hering, 1932)
Crorema jordani Collenette, 1936
Crorema mentiens Walker, 1855
Crorema moco (Collenette, 1936)
Crorema staphylinochrous Hering, 1926
Dasychira andulo Collenette, 1936
Dasychira dasymalla Collenette, 1936
Dasychira exoleta Bethune-Baker, 1911
Dasychira hyphasma Collenette, 1936
Dasychira inconspicua Bethune-Baker, 1911
Dasychira obsoletissima Bethune-Baker, 1911
Dasychira perfida (Bethune-Baker, 1911)
Dasychira pinodes (Bethune-Baker, 1911)
Dasychira styx Bethune-Baker, 1911
Dasychira umbrata (Bethune-Baker, 1911)
Dasychirana obliqualinea Bethune-Baker, 1911
Euproctis citrona Bethune-Baker, 1911
Euproctis conionipha Collenette, 1936
Euproctis convergens Bethune-Baker, 1911
Euproctis dewitzi (Grünberg, 1907)
Euproctis monophyes Swinhoe, 1906
Euproctis ndalla Bethune-Baker, 1911
Euproctis nigrolunulata Bethune-Baker, 1911
Euproctis nigrosquamosa Bethune-Baker, 1911
Euproctis ornata Wichgraf, 1921
Euproctis reutlingeri Holland, 1893
Euproctoides ansorgei (Jordan, 1904)
Euproctoides ertli (Wichgraf, 1922)
Euproctoides miniata Bethune-Baker, 1911
Homochira rendalli (Distant, 1897)
Knappetra fasciata (Walker, 1855)
Lacipa gemmatula Hering, 1926
Lacipa subpunctata Bethune-Baker, 1911
Laelia basibrunnea (Holland, 1893)
Laelia diascia Hampson, 1905
Laelia haematica Hampson, 1905
Laelia lavia Swinhoe, 1903
Leptaroa jordani Hering, 1926
Leucoma albissima Bethune-Baker, 1911
Leucoma luteipes (Walker, 1855)
Lomadonta erythrina Holland, 1893
Lomadonta obscura Swinhoe, 1904
Lymantria carriala Swinhoe, 1903
Lymantriades obliqualinea Bethune-Baker, 1911
Olapa brachycerca Collenette, 1936
Olapa macrocerca Collenette, 1936
Olene ruficosta (Bethune-Baker, 1911)
Orgyia albacostata Bethune-Baker, 1911
Otroeda catenata (Jordan, 1924)
Otroeda vesperina Walker, 1854
Palasea albimacula Wallengren, 1863
Paqueta infima (Holland, 1893)
Parapirga neurabrunnea Bethune-Baker, 1911
Paraxena angola Bethune-Baker, 1911
Paraxena esquamata Bethune-Baker, 1911
Pirgula stictogonia Collenette, 1936
Stracena promelaena (Holland, 1893)

Metarbelidae
Metarbela cymaphora Hampson, 1910
Metarbela inconspicua Gaede, 1929
Metarbela sphacobapta Tams, 1929
Salagena mirabilis Le Cerf, 1919

Noctuidae
Acantholipes plumbeonitens Hampson, 1926
Achaea sordida (Walker, 1865)
Acontia annemaria Hacker, 2007
Acontia antica Walker, 1862
Acontia apatelia (Swinhoe, 1907)
Acontia aurelia Hacker, Legrain & Fibiger, 2008
Acontia bethunebakeri Hacker, Legrain & Fibiger, 2010
Acontia callima Bethune-Baker, 1911
Acontia citrelinea Bethune-Baker, 1911
Acontia discoidea Hopffer, 1857
Acontia gratiosa Wallengren, 1856
Acontia guttifera Felder & Rogenhofer, 1874
Acontia imitatrix Wallengren, 1856
Acontia niphogona (Hampson, 1909)
Acontia okahandja Hacker, Legrain & Fibiger, 2008
Acontia opalinoides Guenée, 1852
Acontia simo Wallengren, 1860
Acontia trimaculata Aurivillius, 1879
Acrapex apicestriata (Bethune-Baker, 1911)
Acrapex brunnea Hampson, 1910
Adisura callima Bethune-Baker, 1911
Aegocera brevivitta Hampson, 1901
Aegocera fervida (Walker, 1854)
Aegocera rectilinea Boisduval, 1836
Anoba glyphica (Bethune-Baker, 1911)
Arrade stenoptera (Bethune-Baker, 1911)
Asota speciosa (Drury, 1773)
Aspidifrontia anomala Berio, 1955
Athetis brunneaplagata (Bethune-Baker, 1911)
Athetis percnopis (Bethune-Baker, 1911)
Baniana trigrammos (Mabille, 1881)
Brephos ansorgei (Jordan, 1904)
Brephos nyassana (Bartel, 1903)
Brevipecten brandbergensis Hacker, 2004
Catada icelomorpha Bethune-Baker, 1911
Catada ndalla Bethune-Baker, 1911
Catephia xanthophaes (Bethune-Baker, 1911)
Cetola pulchra (Bethune-Baker, 1911)
Chaetostephana inclusa (Karsch, 1895)
Chaetostephana rendalli (Rothschild, 1896)
Charitosemia geraldi (Kirby, 1896)
Chlumetia lichenosa (Hampson, 1902)
Choeropais jucunda (Jordan, 1904)
Cirrodiana bella Bethune-Baker, 1911
Corgatha macariodes Hampson, 1910
Crameria amabilis (Drury, 1773)
Cyligramma limacina (Guérin-Méneville, 1832)
Cyligramma magus (Guérin-Méneville, [1844])
Diaphone angolensis Weymer, 1901
Diparopsis tephragramma Bethune-Baker, 1911
Enispades angola Bethune-Baker, 1911
Enispades nigropunctata Bethune-Baker, 1911
Entomogramma pardus Guenée, 1852
Erebus walkeri (Butler, 1875)
Ethionodes brunneaplaga (Bethune-Baker, 1911)
Ethiopica aenictopis (Bethune-Baker, 1911)
Ethiopica leucostigmata Bethune-Baker, 1911
Eublemma acarodes Swinhoe, 1907
Eublemma basiplagata Bethune-Baker, 1911
Eublemma nigribasis Bethune-Baker, 1911
Eublemma nyctopa Bethune-Baker, 1911
Eustrotia amydra (Swinhoe, 1907)
Eustrotia bella Bethune-Baker, 1911
Eustrotia loxosema Bethune-Baker, 1911
Eutelia adoxodes Bethune-Baker, 1911
Eutelia malanga Bethune-Baker, 1911
Gortynodes holophaea Bethune-Baker, 1911
Heliophisma klugii (Boisduval, 1833)
Heraclia jugans (Jordan, 1913)
Heraclia pardalina (Walker, 1869)
Hypena isosocles (Bethune-Baker, 1911)
Hypopleurona acutissima (Bethune-Baker, 1911)
Lophoruza semiscripta (Mabille, 1893)
Marcipa angulina (Mabille, 1881)
Marcipa maculifera (Mabille, 1881)
Marcipa pammicta (Bethune-Baker, 1911)
Masalia disticta (Hampson, 1902)
Masalia flavistrigata (Hampson, 1903)
Masalia galatheae (Wallengren, 1856)
Masalia quilengesi Seymour, 1972
Masalia sublimis (Berio, 1962)
Masalia terracottoides (Rothschild, 1921)
Massaga monteirona Butler, 1874
Mitrophrys gynandra Jordan, 1913
Naarda fuliginaria (Bethune-Baker, 1911)
Naarda tandoana (Bethune-Baker, 1911)
Neuranethes angola Bethune-Baker, 1911
Nodaria melanopa Bethune-Baker, 1911
Nodaria parallela Bethune-Baker, 1911
Nonagria connexa (Bethune-Baker, 1911)
Nyodes brevicornis (Walker, 1857)
Oglasa ansorgei (Bethune-Baker, 1913)
Paralophata ansorgei Bethune-Baker, 1911
Parasiopsis arcuata Bethune-Baker, 1911
Perigea aplecta Bethune-Baker, 1911
Phaegorista similis Walker, 1869
Plecoptera misera (Butler, 1883)
Polydesma umbricola Boisduval, 1833
Polypogon zammodia (Bethune-Baker, 1911)
Ramesodes nycteris Bethune-Baker, 1911
Rivula ochrea (Bethune-Baker, 1911)
Rougeotiana xanthoperas (Hampson, 1926)
Sarmatia albolineata Bethune-Baker, 1911
Sesamia calamistis Hampson, 1910
Sphingomorpha chlorea (Cramer, 1777)
Syngatha elegans Bethune-Baker, 1913
Thiacidas callipona (Bethune-Baker, 1911)
Thiacidas mukim (Berio, 1977)
Thiacidas schausi (Hampson, 1905)
Thiacidas senex (Bethune-Baker, 1911)
Trigonodes angolensis (Weymer, 1908)
Trigonodes hyppasia (Cramer, 1779)
Ugia egcarsia (Bethune-Baker, 1911)

Nolidae
Bryophilopsis anomoiota (Bethune-Baker, 1911)
Eligma hypsoides (Walker, 1869)
Giaura bostrycodes (Bethune-Baker, 1911)
Gigantoceras adoxodes Bethune-Baker, 1911
Nola angola Bethune-Baker, 1911
Selepa ianthina (Bethune-Baker, 1911)
Trogoxestis crenularia (Bethune-Baker, 1911)

Notodontidae
Afroplitis orestes (Kiriakoff, 1955)
Afropydna angolensis Kiriakoff, 1961
Anaphe venata Butler, 1878
Antheua benguelana Viette, 1954
Antheua delicata Bethune-Baker, 1911
Antheua gallans (Karsch, 1895)
Antheua ornata (Walker, 1865)
Antheua trifasciata (Hampson, 1909)
Antheuella psolometopa (Tams, 1929)
Arciera angolensis Kiriakoff, 1979
Atrasana olivacea Kiriakoff, 1955
Bisolita pembertoni (Rothschild, 1910)
Brachychira ferruginea Aurivillius, 1905
Desmeocraera decorata (Wichgraf, 1922)
Epicerura steniptera (Hampson, 1910)
Eujansea afra (Bethune-Baker, 1911)
Eujansea crenata (Kiriakoff, 1962)
Galona serena Karsch, 1895
Haplozana nigrolineata Aurivillius, 1901
Janthinisca postlutea (Kiriakoff, 1959)
Leptolepida varians Kiriakoff, 1962
Lopiena ochracea (Bethune-Baker, 1911)
Notoxantha sesamiodes Hampson, 1910
Odontoperas janthina Kiriakoff, 1959
Phalera atrata (Grünberg, 1907)
Phycitimorpha hollandi (Bethune-Baker, 1911)
Stenostaura columbina Kiriakoff, 1979
Stenostaura malangae (Bethune-Baker, 1911)
Stenostaura varians (Kiriakoff, 1962)
Subscrancia nigra (Aurivillius, 1904)
Trotonotus crenulata Bethune-Baker, 1911

Oecophoridae
Epiphractis phoenicis Meyrick, 1908

Prototheoridae
Prototheora angolae Davis, 1996

Psychidae
Acanthopsyche carbonarius Karsch, 1900
Eumeta mercieri Bourgogne, 1966
Eumeta rougeoti Bourgogne, 1955
Lytrophila sporocentra Meyrick, 1923
Melasina inimica Meyrick, 1908
Melasina isospila Meyrick, 1908
Monda cassualallae Bethune-Baker, 1911
Monda fragilissima Strand, 1911

Pterophoridae
Agdistis bouyeri Gielis, 2008
Paracapperia esuriens (Meyrick, 1932)

Pyralidae
Sindris magnifica Jordan, 1904

Saturniidae
Adafroptilum occidaneum Darge, 2008
Athletes gigas (Sonthonnax, 1902)
Aurivillius arata (Westwood, 1849)
Aurivillius triramis Rothschild, 1907
Bunaea alcinoe (Stoll, 1780)
Bunaeopsis angolana (Le Cerf, 1918)
Bunaeopsis annabellae Lemaire & Rougeot, 1975
Bunaeopsis aurantiaca (Rothschild, 1895)
Bunaeopsis hersilia (Westwood, 1849)
Bunaeopsis jacksoni (Jordan, 1908)
Bunaeopsis oubie (Guérin-Méneville, 1849)
Bunaeopsis princeps (Le Cerf, 1918)
Campimoptilum kuntzei (Dewitz, 1881)
Cinabra hyperbius (Westwood, 1881)
Cirina forda (Westwood, 1849)
Decachorda rosea Aurivillius, 1898
Epiphora albidus (Druce, 1886)
Epiphora vacuna (Westwood, 1849)
Eudaemonia trogophylla Hampson, 1919
Gonimbrasia belina (Westwood, 1849)
Gonimbrasia congolensis Bouvier, 1927
Gonimbrasia rectilineata (Sonthonnax, 1899)
Goodia oxytela Jordan, 1922
Gynanisa ata Strand, 1911
Heniocha dyops (Maassen, 1872)
Holocerina agomensis (Karsch, 1896)
Holocerina angulata (Aurivillius, 1893)
Imbrasia epimethea (Drury, 1772)
Imbrasia ertli Rebel, 1904
Imbrasia obscura (Butler, 1878)
Lobobunaea acetes (Westwood, 1849)
Lobobunaea angasana (Westwood, 1849)
Lobobunaea niepelti Strand, 1914
Lobobunaea phaedusa (Drury, 1782)
Lobobunaea saturnus (Fabricius, 1793)
Ludia arida Jordan, 1938
Ludia orinoptena Karsch, 1892
Melanocera parva Rothschild, 1907
Micragone agathylla (Westwood, 1849)
Micragone ansorgei (Rothschild, 1907)
Nudaurelia anthina (Karsch, 1892)
Nudaurelia anthinoides Rougeot, 1978
Nudaurelia bouvieri (Le Moult, 1933)
Nudaurelia dione (Fabricius, 1793)
Nudaurelia eblis Strecker, 1876
Nudaurelia gueinzii (Staudinger, 1872)
Nudaurelia macrops Rebel, 1917
Nudaurelia macrothyris (Rothschild, 1906)
Orthogonioptilum prox Karsch, 1892
Orthogonioptilum vestigiata (Holland, 1893)
Pselaphelia gemmifera (Butler, 1878)
Pseudantheraea discrepans (Butler, 1878)
Pseudantheraea imperator Rougeot, 1962
Pseudimbrasia deyrollei (J. Thomson, 1858)
Pseudobunaea alinda (Sonthonnax, 1899)
Pseudobunaea callista (Jordan, 1910)
Pseudobunaea cleopatra (Aurivillius, 1893)
Pseudobunaea heyeri (Weymer, 1896)
Pseudobunaea irius (Fabricius, 1793)
Pseudobunaea tyrrhena (Westwood, 1849)
Rohaniella pygmaea (Maassen & Weymer, 1885)
Urota sinope (Westwood, 1849)
Usta terpsichore (Maassen & Weymer, 1885)

Sesiidae
Euhagena nobilis (Druce, 1910)
Nyctaegeria rohani Le Cerf, 1915
Tipulamima hypocilla Le Cerf, 1937

Sphingidae
Acanthosphinx guessfeldti (Dewitz, 1879)
Acherontia atropos (Linnaeus, 1758)
Afrosphinx amabilis (Jordan, 1911)
Agrius convolvuli (Linnaeus, 1758)
Atemnora westermannii (Boisduval, 1875)
Basiothia aureata (Karsch, 1891)
Basiothia charis (Boisduval, 1875)
Basiothia medea (Fabricius, 1781)
Cephonodes hylas (Linnaeus, 1771)
Chloroclanis virescens (Butler, 1882)
Coelonia fulvinotata (Butler, 1875)
Daphnis nerii (Linnaeus, 1758)
Euchloron megaera (Linnaeus, 1758)
Hippotion balsaminae (Walker, 1856)
Hippotion celerio (Linnaeus, 1758)
Hippotion eson (Cramer, 1779)
Hippotion osiris (Dalman, 1823)
Hoplistopus penricei Rothschild & Jordan, 1903
Leptoclanis pulchra Rothschild & Jordan, 1903
Leucophlebia afra Karsch, 1891
Lophostethus dumolinii (Angas, 1849)
Lycosphingia hamatus (Dewitz, 1879)
Macroglossum trochilus (Hübner, 1823)
Neoclanis basalis (Walker, 1866)
Neopolyptychus prionites (Rothschild & Jordan, 1916)
Neopolyptychus pygarga (Karsch, 1891)
Nephele accentifera (Palisot de Beauvois, 1821)
Nephele aequivalens (Walker, 1856)
Nephele comma Hopffer, 1857
Nephele funebris (Fabricius, 1793)
Nephele peneus (Cramer, 1776)
Nephele rosae Butler, 1875
Pantophaea favillacea (Walker, 1866)
Phylloxiphia bicolor (Rothschild, 1894)
Platysphinx constrigilis (Walker, 1869)
Platysphinx stigmatica (Mabille, 1878)
Polyptychoides digitatus (Karsch, 1891)
Polyptychopsis marshalli (Rothschild & Jordan, 1903)
Polyptychus coryndoni Rothschild & Jordan, 1903
Polyptychus murinus Rothschild, 1904
Polyptychus orthographus Rothschild & Jordan, 1903
Praedora marshalli Rothschild & Jordan, 1903
Pseudoclanis rhadamistus (Fabricius, 1781)
Rhadinopasa hornimani (Druce, 1880)
Rufoclanis numosae (Wallengren, 1860)
Rufoclanis rosea (Druce, 1882)
Sphingonaepiopsis ansorgei Rothschild, 1904
Sphingonaepiopsis nana (Walker, 1856)
Temnora albilinea Rothschild, 1904
Temnora elegans (Rothschild, 1895)
Temnora fumosa (Walker, 1856)
Temnora funebris (Holland, 1893)
Temnora radiata (Karsch, 1892)
Temnora sardanus (Walker, 1856)
Temnora scitula (Holland, 1889)
Xanthopan morganii (Walker, 1856)

Thyrididae
Arniocera amoena Jordan, 1907
Chrysotypus quadratus Whalley, 1971
Dysodia vitrina (Boisduval, 1829)
Dysodia zelleri (Dewitz, 1881)
Hapana minima Whalley, 1971
Kuja obliquifascia (Warren, 1908)
Marmax hyparchus (Cramer, 1779)
Netrocera basalis Jordan, 1907

Tineidae
Cimitra horridella (Walker, 1863)

Tortricidae
Bactra difissa Diakonoff, 1964
Bactra legitima Meyrick, 1911
Bactra nea Diakonoff, 1964
Bactra philocherda Diakonoff, 1964
Bactra stagnicolana Zeller, 1852
Eccopsis incultana (Walker, 1863)
Eccopsis praecedens Walsingham, 1897
Epichorista aethocoma Meyrick, 1923
Eucosma anisodelta Meyrick, 1923
Eucosma carcharitis Meyrick, 1923
Multiquaestia albimaculana Karisch, 2005

Uraniidae
Epiplema nigrodorsata Warren, 1901

Zygaenidae
Epiorna ochreipennis (Butler, 1874)
Neobalataea leptis (Jordan, 1907)
Orna angolensis Alberti, 1961

See also
List of butterflies of Angola

References

External links 

Moths
Moths
Angola
Angola